In category theory, a branch of mathematics, a rigid category is a monoidal category where every object is rigid, that is, has a dual X* (the internal Hom [X, 1]) and a morphism 1 → X ⊗ X* satisfying natural conditions. The category is called right rigid or left rigid according to whether it has right duals or left duals. They were first defined (following Alexandre Grothendieck) by Neantro Saavedra Rivano in his thesis on Tannakian categories.

Definition 
There are at least two equivalent definitions of a rigidity.

An object X of a monoidal category is called left rigid if there is an object Y and morphisms  and  such that both compositions

are identities. A right rigid object is defined similarly.

An inverse is an object X−1 such that both X ⊗ X−1 and X−1 ⊗ X are isomorphic to 1, the identity object of the monoidal category. If an object X has a left (respectively right) inverse X−1 with respect to the tensor product then it is left (respectively right) rigid, and X* = X−1.

The operation of taking duals gives a contravariant functor on a rigid category.

Uses 
One important application of rigidity is in the definition of the trace of an endomorphism of a rigid object. The trace can be defined for any pivotal category, i. e. a rigid category such that ( )**, the functor of taking the dual twice repeated, is isomorphic to the identity functor. Then for any right rigid object X, and any other object Y, we may define the isomorphism

and its reciprocal isomorphism

.

Then for any endomorphism , the trace is of f is defined as the composition:

We may continue further and define the dimension of a rigid object to be:
.

Rigidity is also important because of its relation to internal Hom's. If X is a left rigid object, then every internal Hom of the form [X, Z] exists and is isomorphic to Z ⊗ Y. In particular, in a rigid category, all internal Hom's exist.

Alternative terminology

A monoidal category where every object has a left (respectively right) dual is also sometimes called a left (respectively right) autonomous category.  A monoidal category where every object has both a left and a right dual is sometimes called an autonomous category.  An autonomous category that is also symmetric is called a compact closed category.

Discussion 
A monoidal category is a category with a tensor product, precisely the sort of category for which rigidity makes sense.

The category of pure motives is formed by rigidifying the category of effective pure motives.

Notes

References

 

Monoidal categories